Stranded cable may refer to:
Stranded wire
Wire rope